Sergej Trifunović (born 2 September 1972) is a Serbian actor, comedian, singer, politician and citizen activist.

In 2014, he founded a charity foundation Podrži život (Support Life), that helps underprivileged children with serious medical condition to get adequate treatment. He was the president of Movement of Free Citizens from 2019 to 2020.

Early life and education
Sergej was born in Mostar, SR Bosnia and Herzegovina, SFR Yugoslavia to father Tomislav, an actor, and mother Slobodanka, a lawyer. His younger brother, Branislav, is also an actor. His father's career made the family moving between cities, thus Sergej's early years were spent in Mostar, Užice, Kruševac and Belgrade.

His father was born in Mali Popović near Jagodina. In 1990, Trifunović enrolled in the Belgrade Faculty of Drama Arts; fellow students included Nataša Ninković, Vojin Ćetković and Nebojša Glogovac.

Political career

Trifunović participated in protests against authoritarian regimes under Slobodan Milošević and Aleksandar Vučić. During the 2017 presidential election campaign, he endorsed Saša Janković.

The joint report by European Economic and Social Committee and Civic Initiatives noted that Trifunović and his charity foundation have been target of a smear campaign and false accusations by pro-government media and members of ruling parties since 2018.

On January 26, 2019, Trifunović became the 2nd president of Movement of Free Citizens. After nine months of protests over the rise of political violence and after the unsuccessful conclusion of the negotiation mediated by the University of Belgrade Faculty of Political Sciences and NGOs, Trifunović wrote an open letter to David McAllister, the Chairman of the Foreign Affairs Committee of the European Parliament, asking him to consider facilitating a cross-party dialogue on media and election conditions. The first round of inter-party European Parliament-mediated dialogue in Serbia took place two months later.  In December 2019, following three rounds of dialogue, the EP delegation members announced that conditions for fair and free elections had not been established. On January 20, 2020, the Movement of Free Citizens announced boycott of the parliamentary elections, however, the decision was later overturned with the Movement of Free Citizens participating in the elections winning 1.58% of the popular vote and failing to pass the census to enter the National Assembly.

On 16 June 2020, Sergej Trifunović published and then deleted the video showing him, along with Srbijanka Turajlić, singing a Chetnik song, which was followed by numerous criticisms on social networks from the liberal and leftist public in Serbia.

On 8 July 2020, at a protest against the government, Trifunović was attacked by the crowd and got his arcade broken. He claims that he was attacked by the undercover members of the Security Intelligence Agency, and the members of the Leviathan Movement saying that they were there to discredit the protest.

Filmography

Films

TV Shows

 Lisice
 Crni Gruja
 Bitange i princeze
 Sleeper cell

 Neki čudni ljudi

 Na terapiji

Ono kao ljubav
Montevideo, Bog te video!
Andrija i Anđelka
Crno-bijeli svet
Prvaci sveta
Ubice mog oca
Žigosani u reketu
Dug moru
Ujka - novi Horizonti

References

Sources

External links

1972 births
Living people
Serbian male actors
Serbian actor-politicians
Serbian democracy activists
Actors from Mostar
Serbs of Bosnia and Herzegovina
Zoran Radmilović Award winners
Politicians from Mostar